Doratopteryx camerunica is a moth in the Himantopteridae family. It was described by Hering in 1937. It is found in Cameroon.

References

Endemic fauna of Cameroon
Moths described in 1937
Himantopteridae